Cattle Creek is a census-designated place (CDP) in and governed by Garfield County, Colorado, United States. The CDP is a part of the Glenwood Springs, CO Micropolitan Statistical Area. The population of the Cattle Creek CDP was 641 at the United States Census 2010. The Glenwood Springs post office (Zip Code 81601) serves the area.

Geography
The CDP is located in southeastern Garfield County along Colorado State Highway 82 in the valley of the Roaring Fork River. Cattle Creek, a tributary of the Roaring Fork, forms the southern edge of the CDP. Highway 82 leads north  to Glenwood Springs, the county seat, and south  to Carbondale.

Demographics

See also

 List of census-designated places in Colorado

References

External links

Garfield County website

Census-designated places in Garfield County, Colorado
Census-designated places in Colorado